Berean Christian School is a private school in West Palm Beach, Florida. Berean Christian School is a ministry of Grace Fellowship, a local independent church. It was established in 1964. Berean Christian School also offers numerous sports such as volleyball, swimming, cross-country, track, soccer, girls basketball, boys basketball, cheerleading, and most of all football. Their home mascot is the Bulldog. Berean Christian School exists in partnership with parents and the local church to submerse students into a Biblically-based Christian world view. The grades range from preschool to 12th.

Faculty 
William Dupere is the Headmaster of the school. Christopher Skierski is the Secondary Principal. Michelle Bethune is the Elementary Principal.

External links 
 https://www.bereanchristianschool.org

Christian schools in Florida
Educational institutions established in 1964
Buildings and structures in West Palm Beach, Florida
Schools in Palm Beach County, Florida
Private high schools in Florida
Private middle schools in Florida
Private elementary schools in Florida
1964 establishments in Florida